Greene Point is an ice-covered point  northeast of Andrus Point in Lady Newnes Bay, Victoria Land, Antarctica. It was mapped by the United States Geological Survey from surveys and U.S. Navy air photos, 1960–64, and was named by the Advisory Committee on Antarctic Names after Stanley W. Greene, a biologist at McMurdo Station, 1964–65.

References

Headlands of Victoria Land
Borchgrevink Coast